The Sir Bobby Robson Bridge is a  cable-stayed pedestrian footbridge over the River Gipping in Ipswich, England, built at a cost of £800,000. The height of the structure makes it the 2nd highest structure in Ipswich. The bridge was named after Sir Bobby Robson, the ex–Ipswich Town manager, Newcastle United manager and England national football team manager, who died in 2009. Funded by the property developer Fairview, the bridge was constructed in 2009 and designed by Train and Kemp. It connects a residential development with the town centre. Before the construction of the bridge, residents had to walk a considerably long way to the next river crossing.

See also
List of tallest buildings and structures in Ipswich

References

Pedestrian bridges in England
Buildings and structures in Ipswich